Yekaterina von Engelhardt (1761–1829) was a Russian lady in waiting and noblewoman. She was the niece and lover of Grigory Potyomkin, and the favored lady-in-waiting of Catherine the Great. Alongside her sisters, she was given a favored position at the Russian Imperial court during the reign of Catherine, where they were described as "Almost Grand Duchesses", the jewels of the court and honorary members of the Imperial family.

Early life
She was the daughter of Wassily von Engelhardt (1720-1794), member of the Baltic German nobility and his spouse Yelena Alexandrovna Marfa Potemkin (d. 1775), niece of Grigory Potyomkin.

Biography
She was introduced to the Russian court with her five sisters (and her brother) in 1775. They were initially uneducated and ignorant, but was soon given a sophisticated polish and made to be the most favored women at the Russian court; they were treated almost as if they were a part of the Imperial family, and were to be known as : "almost Grand Duchesses" and as the "jewels" and ornaments of the Russian court. Potemkin gave them large dowries and had Catherine appoint them ladies-in-waiting. They were alleged to be the lovers of their uncle, which was one of the most known gossip subjects and scandals of the age.

She became a lady in waiting in 1777, and for a time, Empress Catherine's illegitimate son Bobrinskij was in love with her. Her relationship with Potemkin took place after his affair with her sister Aleksandra was ended in 1779, and was to sporadically continue on and off for the rest of his life. In 1780, she spend some time on the country side with her sister Varvara, and it is possible that she gave birth to the child of her uncle.

In 1781, she married Count Paul Martynovich Skavronsky, who died 1791. In 1798, she married for love to Count Giulio Renato Litta (1763-1839). She was described as kind, passive and indolent.

References

Nobility from the Russian Empire
Ladies-in-waiting from the Russian Empire
Socialites from the Russian Empire
1761 births

1829 deaths
Yekaterina
Burials at the Dukhovskaya Church